Site 45 at the Baikonur Cosmodrome is a launch site used by Zenit rockets. It consists of two pads, one of which is still in use. It has been the launch site for all Soviet and Russian government Zenit launches, along with a commercial launch conducted for Globalstar in 1998, and continuing commercial launches under the Land Launch programme. The main pad at the site is area 45/1, which was completed in 1983 following five years of construction. A second pad, area 45/2, was completed in 1990, but was destroyed by a launch failure in the same year.

The first launch from site 45, using pad 1, occurred on 13 April 1985. This was a sub-orbital test flight of the Zenit-2, and the maiden flight of the Zenit rocket. The launch failed, and was followed up with a second, successful, test flight launched at 08:21 GMT on 21 June 1985. Whilst this launch was also intended to be suborbital, some debris from the launch reached low Earth orbit. The first launch from pad 2 occurred on 22 May 1990, when a Zenit-2 successfully orbited a Tselina-2 ELINT satellite. The resulting explosion completely destroyed the launch pad, and was reported to have lifted a 1,000 tonne metal structure 20 metres into the air, and to have caused significant damage to lighting towers 100 metres from the pad. Zenit launches resumed from pad 1 around ten months later, pad 2 was not rebuilt.

On 29 June 2007, the first Zenit-2M was launched from pad 1, followed by the first Zenit-3SLB on 28 April 2008.

Facilities to support crewed launches were built at both pads. These included large mobile access towers, which would have allowed the crew to board a spacecraft on top of the rocket. These towers were never used. The tower at area 45/1 is still intact, and the tower at area 45/2 is still standing, but was heavily damaged in the October 1990 explosion. The towers are not used in uncrewed launch operations, as all systems are automated, and no access to the rocket is required.

See also
 Ocean Odyssey

References

Literature 
 "Baikonur. Korolev. Yangel." - M. I. Kuznetsk, Voronezh: IPF "Voronezh", 1997, 
 "Look back and look ahead. Notes of a military engineer" - Rjazhsky A. A., 2004, SC. first, the publishing house of the "Heroes of the Fatherland" 
 «A breakthrough in space» - Konstantin Vasilyevich Gerchik, M: LLC "Veles", 1994, - 
 «At risk,» - A. A. Toul, Kaluga, "the Golden path", 2001, - 
 "Bank of the Universe" - edited by Boltenko A. C., Kyiv, 2014., publishing house "Phoenix", 
 "My first life" - Е. A. Anufrienko.

	

Baikonur Cosmodrome